Pennsylvania's State Treasurer election was held November 2, 2004. Necessary primary elections were held on April 27, 2004. Bob Casey Jr. who was term limited in his position as Auditor General, successfully earned the Democratic nomination for Treasurer (he was unopposed in the primary) and won in the general election for this post by a comfortable margin. Republicans had trouble recruiting a top-tier candidate. Jean Craige Pepper, an Erie financial executive, was the only Republican who filed.

General election

References

2004 Pennsylvania elections
2004
Pennsylvania